Dalilah may refer to:

 Dalilah or Delilah, name
 Dalilah (bellydancer), Spanish oriental dancer
 Dalilah (crater), a crater in the northern hemisphere of Saturn's moon Enceladus
 Dalilah the Crafty, a character in One Thousand and One Nights

See also 
 Tropical Storm Dalila